David's angelshark (Squatina david) is a species of angelshark newly described in 2016. It can grow up to around 75 cm in length and is coloured greyish to brownish yellow. Male specimen are dark spotted, while females have abundant whitish spots. David's angelshark inhabits the northern coast of South America from Colombia to Suriname and is currently known from a depth between 100 and 150 m.

It is a sister species of the angular angel shark (Squatina guggenheim) and the hidden angelshark (Squatina occulta).

References

David's angelshark
Fish of Colombia
Fish of Venezuela
Fish of Suriname
David's angelshark